Gergő Beliczky (born 3 July 1990) is a Hungarian professional footballer who plays as a forward for Csákvár.

Career
Born in Budapest, Beliczky has played in Hungary and the Netherlands for Vasas SC, Zwolle, Ferencváros and Pápa.

BFC Siófok
On 27 February 2020, Beliczky joined BFC Siófok on a contract for the rest of the season.

Csákvár
On 19 January 2023, Beliczky signed with Csákvár.

References

External links
 

1990 births
Footballers from Budapest
21st-century Hungarian people
Living people
Hungarian footballers
Association football forwards
Hungary under-21 international footballers
Vasas SC players
PEC Zwolle players
Ferencvárosi TC footballers
Lombard-Pápa TFC footballers
Gyirmót FC Győr players
Győri ETO FC players
Kaposvári Rákóczi FC players
BFC Siófok players
Dorogi FC players
Tiszakécske FC footballers
Csákvári TK players
Nemzeti Bajnokság I players
Eerste Divisie players
Nemzeti Bajnokság II players
Hungarian expatriate footballers
Expatriate footballers in the Netherlands
Hungarian expatriate sportspeople in the Netherlands